Athletics is one of the sports at the biennial Universiade competition. It has been one of the event's competed sports since the inaugural edition.

Editions

All Time Medal table 
Note  Last updated after the 2019 Summer Universiade

See also
List of Universiade records in athletics
List of Universiade medalists in athletics (men)
World University Cross Country Championships
International Athletics Championships and Games

External links

 
Sports at the Summer Universiade
Universiade